Ward & Partners of Belfast was a Northern Irish stained glass manufacturer in the early- to mid-twentieth-century that predominantly focused on ecclesiastical commissions. They were the principal competitors in Northern Ireland of Clokey Studios, founded by Walter Francis Clokey.

Works
Robert Johnstone Memorial Stained Glass Window (c.1918) in First Presbyterian Church of Carrickfergus, Carrickfergus, County Antrim, Northern Ireland

British stained glass artists and manufacturers
Glassmaking companies of Ireland
Defunct glassmaking companies
Culture in Belfast
Companies of Northern Ireland